The First Secretary of the Socialist Party (French: Premier secrétaire du Parti socialiste) is the most senior politician within the Socialist Party in France. The office has been held by Olivier Faure since 7 April 2018.

List of officeholders

Notes 

Socialist Party France